Graham Barnett (17 May 1936 – 17 June 2019) was an English footballer who played as an inside-forward.

He began his career with Port Vale in 1956, and helped the club to win the Fourth Division title in the 1958–59 season. He was sold on to Tranmere Rovers for a £5,000 fee in March 1960. In 1961 he signed with Halifax Town, before he emigrated to Australia the following year so as to play for South Coast United. He also represented the Australia B team in 1964. After a spell with Hakoah, he was appointed as manager of South Coast United. He later managed The Corinthians, before returning to the UK to work behind the scenes at Port Vale.

Career

Port Vale
Barnett, from a mining family, worked down Hanley Deep Pit at the age of fifteen. Expected to start a mining career, he instead impressed playing football at Canon Street School and Stoke Boys' Club, and won an amateur contract at Port Vale in 1954. During his national service he played alongside Ken Higgs in the Army Medical Corps football side. He signed professionally for Port Vale in June 1956, and won a place in Freddie Steele's first team after scoring eighteen goals in seventeen games for the reserves and also scoring twice past Middlesbrough's Rolando Ugolini in a friendly for the first team. He scored on his debut at inside-left in a 4–2 defeat to Millwall at The Den on 13 December 1958. Manager Norman Low described him as the 'supreme goal poacher' as he netted 20 goals in 22 appearances in what was left of the season, helping the club to win the Fourth Division title. Despite this he did not get on with Low, and had many rows with his manager. He was the club's top scorer during the 1959–60 season with 17 goals in 35 games, including four against Halifax Town in a 7–0 win at Vale Park on 28 December. He also grew a beard and refused to shave until Vale were knocked out of the FA Cup, doing so after defeat to Aston Villa at the fifth round stage.

Tranmere Rovers
He was sold to Peter Farrell's Tranmere Rovers for a £5,000 fee in March 1960. Tranmere were heading for relegation into the Fourth Division, but Barnett helped them to maintain their Third Division status by the end of the season. The "Superwhites" then failed to avoid relegation in the 1960–61 season under the stewardship of Walter Galbraith, and Barnett moved away from Prenton Park to Halifax Town in August 1961.

Halifax
He scored nine goals in 32 Third Division appearances for Halifax in the 1961–62 campaign.

Australia
He ended his career in Australia, where he played for NSW Division One sides South Coast United and Sydney Hakoah and coached at South Coast United. He also represented Australia in a "B team" game against English First Division club Everton at Melbourne's Olympic Park Stadium on 10 May 1964, which ended in an 8–2 defeat.

Macclesfield Town
Barnett returned to England and joined Cheshire County League side Macclesfield Town, scoring two goals on his debut in a 3–3 draw with Witton Albion at Moss Rose on 1 January 1966. He then scored another brace against Wrexham in his next appearance, and would score a total of six goals in ten games for the "Silkmen".

Later life 
He returned to England in 1971 and coached Vale's "A" team, later working in the club's commercial department and running the Y.T.S. team until 1985, at which point he became a newsagent. He and wife Ena and went on to have three children, seven grandchildren, and seven great-grandchildren. He died at the age of 83 in June 2019 and the following year his daughter, Jane Beresford, reported that the family had donated his brain to dementia research.

Career statistics
Source:

Honours
Port Vale
Football League Fourth Division: 1958–59

References

1936 births
2019 deaths
Sportspeople from Hanley, Staffordshire
English footballers
Association football forwards
Port Vale F.C. players
Tranmere Rovers F.C. players
Halifax Town A.F.C. players
South Coast United players
Hakoah Sydney City East FC players
Macclesfield Town F.C. players
English Football League players
Association football coaches
Port Vale F.C. non-playing staff
English expatriate footballers
Expatriate soccer players in Australia
Deaths from dementia in England